Testimonies Against The Jews is a 4th or 5th century pseudepigraphical text written in the name of Gregory of Nyssa which contains Old Testament testimonies against the Jews. Its author is often called Pseudo-Gregory.

Authorship 
The text is widely agreed to be pseudepigraphical. It is dated to the late 4th century at the earliest due to its familiarity with the Sabellian controversy. Some scholars prefer a 5th-century date after the death of Gregory of Nyssa.

Contents 
It mentions Simon the Magician.

References 

5th-century Christian texts
Jewish–Christian debate
Old Testament
Simon the Sorcerer